The Buchanan Brothers were two brothers, Chester and Lester Buchanan, who recorded country music during the 1940s on the RCA Victor label.  They had a top ten hit, "Atomic Power", released in August 1946; this song was also featured in the 1982 movie The Atomic Café.  Another song, 1947's "(When You See) Those Flying Saucers", was used in the opening scene of the 2009 animated release Monsters vs. Aliens.

Their releases were under two different artist names: "The Buchanan Brothers (Chester and Lester) Singing with Orchestra" and "Buchanan Brothers and the Georgia Catamounts."

They are not to be confused with the pop-rock trio by that name from the late 1960s, which included Terry Cashman, Gene Pistilli, and Tommy West.

Discography

Personnel
August 22, 1944: Violin/Leader: Mac Ceppos; Guitar: Tony Gottuso & Lester Buchanan; Mandolin: Chester Buchanan; Accordion: Edwin Smith; Bass: Julie M. Bedra.
September 29, 1944: Violin/Leader: Mac Ceppos; Guitar: Lester Buchanan & Tony Gottuso; Mandolin: Chester Buchanan; Accordion: Edwin Smith; Bass: Sol Braun; Piano: Bob Miller.
December 20, 1944: New York Studio No. 1; Time: Orchestra (9:30 to 12:30), Studio (9:00 to 1:00), (EK-9:00 to 11:00), (JM-11:00 to 1:00); Miss Van Sciver and Mr. Bob Miller present. Leader & Violin: Mac Ceppos; Guitar: Tony Gatusso & Lester Buchanan; Mandolin: Chester Buchanan; Bass Violin: Lester Braun.
June 19, 1945: New York Studio No. 2; Bob Miller present; Union Musicians Used; Time: 9:00 to 12:00; Violin/Leader: Mac Ceppos; Trumpet: William A. Graham; Bass Violin: Lester Braun; Steel Guitar: Samuel Persoff; Violin: Edward Asherman; Electric Guitar & Clarinet: Edwin H. Grosso.
November 27, 1945: A & R Rep: Mr. S.H. Sholes; Studio: New York No. 1; Union Musicians Used; Time: 7:30 P.M. to 10:30 P.M.; Violin/Leader: Mac Ceppos; Violin: Val Olman; Bass: Lester Braun; Trumpet: George Erwin; Guitar: Anthony Gottuso; Guitar: Andy Sannella; Piano: Bob Miller.
March 19, 1946: A & R Rep: Messers. Sholes and Case; Studio: New York No. 2; Union Musicians Used; Time: 9:30 to 12:30; Violin/Leader: Bertrand Hirsch; Violin: Samuel Raitz; Guitar: Arthur S. Ryerson Jr.; Clarinet: Sal Franzella; Bass: William Feinbloom; Steel Guitar: Ed. McMullen; Drums: Chauncey Morehouse.
August 7, 1946: A & R Rep: Mr. S.H. Sholes; Studio: New York No. 1; Union Musicians Used; Time: 5:30 P.M. to 9:00 (plus 1 hr. set up); Leader/Violin: Bertrand Hirsch; Violin: Edward O. South; Sax: Sal Franzella; Bass: Lester Braun; Trumpet: Henry Lewis; Guitar: Anthony Gottuso & Vincent Maffei; Piano: Nick Tagg; Drums: Jack Saunders.
July 16, 1947: A & R Rep: Messrs S. Sholes & C. Grean; Studio: New York No. 2; Union Musicians Used; Time: 1:30 P.M. to 4:30 P.M.; Guitar: Lester Buchanan; Mandolin: Chester Buchanan; Electric Guitar: Edwin Grosso; Guitar: Arthur Ryerson; Bass: Charles Grean.

References
All of the above information comes from the RCA Victor ledger/studio sheets, which are currently housed at the BMG Music Archives.

External links
Conelrad entry about the song, "Atomic Power"

American country music groups
RCA Victor artists